Southdown House is a Grade II* listed building in Patcham, Brighton and Hove, England. It is a Georgian house made out of brick and flint, and is now situated at 51 Old London Road.

History
The exact date of the construction of Southdown House is unknown, however it is believed to have been built in the early eighteenth century, in a cluster of thirteen buildings in Patcham. The house is in the largest cluster of eighteenth century buildings in Brighton and Hove. The two-storey house was built out of brick and flint, and contains five bays. Originally, the house had adjacent stables, which were converted into a house in the twentieth century; that building is now a Grade II listed building. In 1906, the house is recorded as being owned by a Major Howard Vyse Welch, who was a judge at that year's Sussex County Show, and fought in the East Surrey Regiment during the First World War. The house was later owned by a man named Eric Poore, who died in 1953; at the time, the estate was valued at £30,104. The house became a Grade II* listed building in 1952, and a late nineteenth or early twentieth century lamppost outside the property was listed as a Grade II listed building in 1999.

Notes

References

Houses in Brighton and Hove
Grade II* listed buildings in Brighton and Hove
Grade II* listed houses
Houses completed in the 18th century